In numerical analysis, a cubic Hermite spline or cubic Hermite interpolator is a spline where each piece is a third-degree polynomial specified in Hermite form, that is, by its values and first derivatives at the end points of the corresponding domain interval.

Cubic Hermite splines are typically used for interpolation of numeric data specified at given argument values , to obtain a continuous function.  The data should consist of the desired function value and derivative at each . (If only the values are provided, the derivatives must be estimated from them.)  The Hermite formula is applied to each interval  separately. The resulting spline will be continuous and will have continuous first derivative.

Cubic polynomial splines can be specified in other ways, the Bezier cubic being the most common.  However, these two methods provide the same set of splines, and data can be easily converted between the Bézier and Hermite forms; so the names are often used as if they were synonymous.  

Cubic polynomial splines are extensively used in computer graphics and geometric modeling to obtain curves or motion trajectories that pass through specified points of the plane or three-dimensional space.  In these applications, each coordinate of the plane or space is separately interpolated by a cubic spline function of a separate parameter t. 
Cubic polynomial splines are also used extensively in structural analysis applications, such as Euler–Bernoulli beam theory.  Cubic polynomial splines have also been applied to mortality analysis and mortality forecasting.

Cubic splines can be extended to functions of two or more parameters, in several ways.  Bicubic splines (Bicubic interpolation) are often used to interpolate data on a regular rectangular grid, such as pixel values in a digital image or altitude data on a terrain.  Bicubic surface patches, defined by three bicubic splines, are an essential tool in computer graphics.

Cubic splines are often called csplines, especially in computer graphics. Hermite splines are named after Charles Hermite.

Interpolation on a single interval

Unit interval [0, 1]

where t ∈ [0, 1].

Interpolation on an arbitrary interval
Interpolating  in an arbitrary interval  is done by mapping the latter to  through an affine (degree-1) change of variable. The formula is

where , and  refers to the basis functions, defined below. Note that the tangent values have been scaled by  compared to the equation on the unit interval.

Uniqueness
The formula specified above provides the unique third-degree polynomial path between the two points with the given tangents.

Proof. Let  be two third-degree polynomials satisfying the given boundary conditions. Define  then:
 
 
So  must be of the form

Calculating the derivative gives

We know furthermore that

 

 

Putting and  together, we deduce that , and therefore  thus

Representations

We can write the interpolation polynomial as

These can be written in different ways, each way revealing different properties:

The "expanded" column shows the representation used in the definition above.
The "Bernstein" column shows the decomposition of the Hermite basis functions into Bernstein polynomials of order 3:

Using this connection you can express cubic Hermite interpolation in terms of cubic Bézier curves with respect to the four values  and do Hermite interpolation using the de Casteljau algorithm.
It shows that in a cubic Bézier patch the two control points in the middle determine the tangents of the interpolation curve at the respective outer points.

We can also write the polynomial in standard form as 

where the control points and tangents are coefficients. This permits efficient evaluation of the polynomial at various values of t since the constant coefficients can be computed once and reused.

Interpolating a data set

The choice of tangents is not unique, and there are several options available.

Finite difference

The simplest choice is the three-point difference, not requiring constant interval lengths:
 
for internal points , and one-sided difference at the endpoints of the data set.

Cardinal spline  

A cardinal spline, sometimes called a canonical spline, is obtained if
 
is used to calculate the tangents. The parameter  is a tension parameter that must be in the interval . In some sense, this can be interpreted as the "length" of the tangent. Choosing  yields all zero tangents, and choosing  yields a Catmull–Rom spline.

Catmull–Rom spline  

For tangents chosen to be
 
a Catmull–Rom spline is obtained, being a special case of a cardinal spline. This assumes uniform parameter spacing.

The curve is named after Edwin Catmull and Raphael Rom. The principal advantage of this technique is that the points along the original set of points also make up the control points for the spline curve. Two additional points are required on either end of the curve. The uniform Catmull–Rom implementation can produce loops and self-intersections. The chordal and centripetal Catmull–Rom implementations  solve this problem, but use a slightly different calculation. In computer graphics, Catmull–Rom splines are frequently used to get smooth interpolated motion between key frames. For example, most camera path animations generated from discrete key-frames are handled using Catmull–Rom splines. They are popular mainly for being relatively easy to compute, guaranteeing that each key frame position will be hit exactly, and also guaranteeing that the tangents of the generated curve are continuous over multiple segments.

Kochanek–Bartels spline

Monotone cubic interpolation

If a cubic Hermite spline of any of the above listed types is used for interpolation of a monotonic data set, the interpolated function will not necessarily be monotonic, but monotonicity can be preserved by adjusting the tangents.

Interpolation on the unit interval with matched derivatives at endpoints

 

In addition, assume that the tangents at the endpoints are defined as the centered differences of the adjacent points:

To evaluate the interpolated f(x) for a real x, first separate x into the integer portion n and fractional portion u:

 
 
 
 

where  denotes the floor function, which returns the largest integer no larger than x.

Then the Catmull–Rom spline is  

where  denotes the matrix transpose. The bottom equality is depicting the application of Horner's method.

This writing is relevant for tricubic interpolation, where one optimization requires computing CINTu sixteen times with the same u and different p.

See also
 Bicubic interpolation, a generalization to two dimensions
 Tricubic interpolation, a generalization to three dimensions
 Hermite interpolation
 Multivariate interpolation
 Spline interpolation
 Discrete spline interpolation

References

External links
 Spline Curves, Prof. Donald H. House Clemson University
 Multi-dimensional Hermite Interpolation and Approximation, Prof. Chandrajit Bajaj, Purdue University
 Introduction to Catmull–Rom Splines, MVPs.org
 Interpolating Cardinal and Catmull–Rom splines
 Interpolation methods: linear, cosine, cubic and hermite (with C sources)
 Common Spline Equations 

Splines (mathematics)
Interpolation